Kevin Nicolas Kis (born 26 September 1990) is a Belgian professional footballer who plays as a left-back for Belgian National Division 1 club Patro Eisden.

Career
Kis joined Belgian National Division 1 club Patro Eisden on 1 June 2022.

References

External links
 Voetbal International profile 
 

1990 births
Living people
Belgian footballers
R.C.S. Verviétois players
K.R.C. Genk players
K.V.C. Westerlo players
K.A.S. Eupen players
Fortuna Sittard players
K.S.V. Roeselare players
Lommel S.K. players
K. Patro Eisden Maasmechelen players
Belgian Pro League players
Challenger Pro League players
Belgian National Division 1 players
Eerste Divisie players
Association football defenders